Tanthof is a quarter in the South of Delft, the Netherlands. It was built in the 1970s and 1980s and consists mainly of low-rise buildings. The area is divided in two parts, Tanthof-East and Tanthof-West.

West and East 
Tanthof-West and Tanthof-East were separated on purpose by the old road to Abtswoude, in the South of Delft. These two areas are directly connected to each other only for pedestrians and bicyclists. When the quarter was designed, the architects followed the old creeks. The houses in these two separate areas have very different architectures.

More than half of the houses in Tanthof-East were built for single-family dwellings. About one third of the population lives in a traditional family setting.
Tanthof-West is an area with a high number of young people and young infants. There are three elementary schools and three kindergartens.

The facilities 
On the border between East and West is a children's farm with a water playground. There is a tennis court on 'Straat van Malakka', a sports hall on 'Fretstraat' and there is a sports complex in the South of Tanthof-East. In Tanthof-East, there is a shopping centre on 'Dasstraat' and Tanthof-West got its shopping area on 'Bikolaan'. The distance between Tanthof and the centre of Delft is approximately three kilometres; it is easily accessible by bicycle. Delft University of Technology is only ten minutes away by bicycle. The Delft Zuid railway station lies next to Tanthof-East.

Trivial 
The sand needed for building Tanthof was dug up from the area now called Delftse Hout. This area is nowadays a recreational area with some lakes.

On January 1, 2005, there were 9100 people registered in Tanthof-West, spread over 3795 houses. In East there live 6624 people in 3160 houses. This is 17% of the total population of Delft.

South to Tanthof is a recreational area called Abtswoudse Bos.

At this moment, the city is building a new community centre.

Populated places in South Holland